The 1965 Tangerine Bowl was a postseason college football bowl game between the Maine Black Bears and the East Carolina Pirates.

Background
The Pirates were champion of the Southern Conference in their first year of play after years of independence. The Black Bears were the champion of the Yankee Conference since 1961. The game was one of four regional finals in the College Division, the predecessor of Division II; the other three postseason games were the Pecan, Grantland Rice, and Camellia bowls, also played on December 11.

Game summary
Dick DeVarney went down early in the game with both a leg injury and a separated shoulder, hurting the chances of the Black Bears. Pete Kriz gave the Pirates a lead on a 24-yard field goal in the second quarter. George Richardson threw a 35-yard touchdown pass to Jim Abernathy to increase the lead to 10 before halftime. The Pirates piled on in the third quarter with a touchdown run by fullback Dave Alexander, and a touchdown pass from him to Churchill Grimes (after an interception), which made it 24–0. Finally, Alexander ran for a 55-yard touchdown in the fourth quarter to put an exclamation point on the game and give the Pirates their third consecutive bowl victory. Alexander was named the game's MVP. It was East Carolina's second straight victory in the Tangerine Bowl, the College Division's Eastern regional final, and the Pirates' third straight 9–1 season.

Aftermath
East Carolina moved up to the University Division for the next season but the Pirates did not play in a bowl game until 1978, in the Independence Bowl. The Black Bears did not win another conference title until 1974, sharing it with UMass. When the College Division was retired after the 1972 season, Maine went to Division II in 1973 and moved up to Division I FCS when it started in 1978 as Division I-AA.

Statistics

References

Tangerine Bowl
Citrus Bowl (game)
East Carolina Pirates football bowl games
Maine Black Bears football bowl games
Tangerine Bowl
Tangerine Bowl